is a former Japanese football player. She played for Japan national team.

Club career
Watanabe was born on July 2, 1970. She played for Fujita Tendai SC Mercury.

National team career
On June 1, 1988, when Watanabe was 17 years old, she debuted for Japan national team against United States. She played at 1989 AFC Championship and 1990 Asian Games. She was also a member of Japan for 1991 World Cup. She played 19 games and scored 2 goals for Japan until 1991.

National team statistics

References

External links

1970 births
Living people
Japanese women's footballers
Japan women's international footballers
Nadeshiko League players
Fujita SC Mercury players
Asian Games silver medalists for Japan
Asian Games medalists in football
Women's association football defenders
Footballers at the 1990 Asian Games
Medalists at the 1990 Asian Games
1991 FIFA Women's World Cup players